Lasius colei is a species of ant belonging to the genus Lasius, formerly a part of the genus (now a subgenus) Acanthomyops. Described in 1968 by Wing, the species is native to the United States.

References

External links

colei
Hymenoptera of North America
Insects of the United States
Insects described in 1968